The Washington metropolitan area is a geographic zone surrounding Washington, D.C., and used for statistical purposes.

Washington metropolitan area also may refer to one of the following U.S. statistical zones:
 Washington, North Carolina, micropolitan area
 Washington, Indiana, micropolitan area
 Washington Court House, Ohio, micropolitan area

See also
Washington (disambiguation)